The Winslow Ames House is a prefabricated modular International Style house in New London, Connecticut, United States. It was designed by Robert W. McLaughlin Jr. and was built in 1933. Winslow Ames, a professor of art history at Connecticut College and the art director of the Lyman Allyn Museum, had the home built after attending the Century of Progress Exposition in Chicago. Constructed for $7,500, the prefabricated house is one of two surviving Motohomes produced by McLaughlin's company American Houses Inc. The modular house, comprising three rectangles and a flat roof, was constructed on a concrete slab with a welded steel framework. It was made with asbestos panels and features a core component that provides the heating and plumbing functions for the house. The other two modules feature two bedrooms and a one-car garage.

Ames and his family resided in the house briefly, the Connecticut College acquired the house in 1949 and used it for faculty housing until 1986. The house was in a state of disrepair by 1989 and was a hazard due to its construction with asbestos panels. It was slated to be demolished, but Ms. Hendrickson rallied supporter to the save the house after uncovering its history. A restoration and rehabilitation project was completed in 1994 and it was listed on the National Register of Historic Places in 1995. The other prefabricated house built by Ames, House at 130 Mohegan Avenue, was also added the National Register of Historic Places in 2009.

Construction 
The Winslow Ames House was unlike other homes of the 1930s, it is a modular home that was constructed on a concrete slab and constructed with a welded steel framework. The designer of the house was John B. McLaughlin Jr., who co-founded American Houses Inc. in 1932. McLaughlin's designs focused on inexpensive housing through mass production and new materials and technology. The International Style house was modular and intended to allow easy enlargement, dismantling and relocation of the structure if needed. The houses, termed "Motohomes", featured modular "motounits" that contained heating and plumbing equipment. The use of steel in the prefabricated homes would later be limited by World War II, which made steel unavailable for civilian use. After the war, prefabricated homes were typically made of wood and offices were normally constructed of steel and concrete.

The house bears the name of Winslow Ames, a professor of art history at Connecticut College and the art director of the Lyman Allyn Museum. In 1933, Ames decided to construct two houses on the museum-owned property after seeing prefabricated homes at the Century of Progress Exposition in Chicago. Ames had a strong interest in the Modernism movement and believed such houses would become predominant. The Ames house cost $7,500, similar to other McLaughlin houses from 1933 and 1934, which ranged from $3,500 to $7,500 each. Later, Ames and his family would briefly take up residence in the house. The other house, known as the "House at 130 Mohegan Avenue" would be added the National Register of Historic Places in 2009.

The Winslow Ames house rests on a concrete foundation and has a welded steel skeleton. The walls were made of  white-painted panels that were constructed of asbestos board over an insulating core. The two-story house is composed of three rectangular modules, offset to create an irregular plan, with a flat roof structure. The largest block in the middle contains the service core with the kitchen and bathroom. The left block contains the main entry, stair hall and two bedrooms. The right block consists of the one-car garage and its second story only covers its overlap with the middle block.

Use 
The house was ready for occupancy in 1934 and was used by many tenants, but the Ames sold the house to the Connecticut College in 1949. Sometime after its completion, Winslow Ames and his family lived in the house for a brief period. From 1949 to 1987, the college used it for faculty housing. One of the tenets, Mary Kent, lived in the house with her husband and three children from 1958 through 1961. Throughout its life the original furnace, kitchen cabinets, plumbing fixtures were replaced, but the core module has retained its purpose. The house fell into a state of disrepair, becoming an "eyesore". By 1989, the college was concerned with the asbestos in the building and obtained a permit to demolish the house; the college intended to use the land for a boathouse. After its restoration was completed, the Connecticut College uses the house as an office and for meeting rooms.

Restoration 
The house was saved through the efforts of Ms. Hendrickson, who uncovered the history surrounding the house and its designer. The house was a deemed a "rare survivor" because only one other Motohome remained in White Plains, New York. Updated. Another motohome exsits is Madison, WI. The Earnest T. Eggiman house  Hendrickson gathered supporters, including from the students and faculty of the college and New London Landmarks to save the house. The demolition was delayed and in May 1990, the Connecticut Historical Commission gave the college $24,000. The college matched the funds, which were originally planned for its demolition. During the restoration, the asbestos board panels were covered over non-asbestos panels that mimic the appearance of the original. A new roof was installed and the windows were replaced with vertical casement windows which were originally used. The interior and exterior of the house was coated with white paint, but the restoration did not revert the flooring to the original Masonite rectangles. The restoration project was completed in 1994 and it was listed on the National Register of Historic Places in 1995.

See also
House at 130 Mohegan Avenue
National Register of Historic Places listings in New London County, Connecticut

Notes

References

Houses on the National Register of Historic Places in Connecticut
Houses completed in 1933
Houses in New London, Connecticut
National Register of Historic Places in New London County, Connecticut
International style architecture in Connecticut
Connecticut College